Robinson Souttar (23 October 1848 – 4 April 1912) was a British Liberal Party politician.

He first stood for Parliament at the 1892 general election, when he was an unsuccessful candidate in the Conservative-held Oxford seat.

He was elected at the 1895 general election as the member of parliament (MP) for Dumfriesshire, defeating the sitting Liberal Unionist MP William Maxwell by a majority of only 13 votes. Maxwell regained the seat in 1900, and Souttar did not stand again.

References

External links 

1848 births
1912 deaths
Scottish Liberal Party MPs
UK MPs 1895–1900